Thumbtack is an American home services website.  It is an online directory that allows users to search for, rate, and hire local service providers to work on a variety of personal projects, including home improvement, financial and legal services, and event planning. The company is backed by Sequoia Capital, Tiger Global Management, Javelin Venture Partners, Baillie Gifford, and Capital G, among others.

Early years 
Thumbtack was founded in 2008 by Marco Zappacosta, Jeremy Tunnell, Jonathan Swanson, and Sander Daniels.

Investment
In June 2010, Thumbtack.com raised $1.2 million in funding, primarily from angel investors. In January 2012, Thumbtack raised another $4.5 million through a Series A round of venture capital funding. In June 2013, Thumbtack raised an additional $12.5 million through a Series B round of venture capital funding. In May 2014, Thumbtack raised $30 million through a Series C round of venture capital funding from Sequoia Capital and Tiger Global Management. In August 2014, Thumbtack raised $100 million through a Series D round of venture capital funding, led by Google Capital. In September 2015, Thumbtack raised $125 million of venture capital funding, led by Baillie Gifford.

In July 2019 the company secured $150 million in Series F at a valuation of nearly $1.7 billion. 

In July 2021 the company raised $275 million at a $3.2 billion valuation.

Competitors
Thumbtack's major competitors include Yelp, HomeAdvisor, Angi and TaskRabbit.

References

External links

Companies based in San Francisco
American companies established in 2009
Business services companies established in 2009
Internet properties established in 2009
Privately held companies based in California
Online marketplaces of the United States
Freelance marketplace websites
2009 establishments in California
Employment websites in the United States